The National Museum of Lithuania, established in 1952, is a state-sponsored historical museum that encompasses several significant structures and a wide collection of written materials and artifacts. It also organizes archeological digs in Lithuania.

History

The Museum of Antiquities in Vilnius, founded by Eustachy Tyszkiewicz in 1855, was the forerunner of today's museum. At its inception, the museum focused on the culture and history of the Lithuanian Grand Duchy. Made up mostly of Polish private collections, it was quite popular and received many visitors. After the January Uprising of 1863, the Russian Empire moved much of the collection to Moscow; the remaining collections were re-organized and were incorporated into the Vilnius Public Library. From 1866 to 1914, the museum and the library operated together. In 1915, when the Eastern Front of World War I approached Vilnius, more of the exhibits was taken to Russia. 

After Lithuanian independence was established in 1918, the Museum of History and Ethnography was founded, based on the collections in the Museum of Antiquities and the Lithuanian Scientific Society. Its director was Jonas Basanavičius, one of the signatories to the Act of Independence of Lithuania. After 1919, Vilnius became a part of Poland, and the organization was incorporated into Vilnius University.

In 1941, the Academy of Sciences acquired the collections of all the museums in Vilnius. The museum again became a separate entity in 1952 under the direction of the historian Vincas 
Žilėnas. In 1967, the museum established itself at the Vilnius Castle Complex's New Arsenal.

The museum hosted a major exposition in 1968. During the 1970s and 1980s historic materials from across the country were gathered. In 1992, after Lithuania re-established its independence, it was renamed the National Museum of Lithuania. It is now part of the Ministry of Culture.

Organization

The museum has five main departments: History and Latest History, Archaeology, Ethnography, Numismatics, and Iconography, containing a total of 800,000 items.

The collections are housed at:

 New Arsenal at the Vilnius Castle Complex
 Old Arsenal at the Vilnius Castle Complex
 Gediminas Tower in Vilnius
 Bastion of Vilnius Defensive Wall
 Kazys Varnelis House-Museum
 House of the Signatories in Vilnius
 Vincas Kudirka Museum in the Šakiai district
 Jonas Basanavičius Birthplace in the Vilkaviškis district
 Memorial Homestead of Jonas Šliūpas in Palanga

Additional departments belonging to the institution are the Department of Information and Education, the Department for Displays Registration and Preservation, the Département for Restoration and the Department of Publishing.

References

 Museum official website
 Museums of Lithuania

Museums in Vilnius
Lithuania

be:Віленскі музей старажытнасцей